The Heroes Monument is a monument in Surabaya, East Java, Indonesia. It is the main symbol of the city, dedicated to the people who died during the Battle of Surabaya on 10 November 1945. The 10 November Museum is located under the monument.

This monument is 41.15 metres tall and is pillar-shaped. It was built to commemorate the events of 10 November 1945 at the Battle of Surabaya. It is 
the venue every 10 November for the commemoration of the events of 1945, when many heroes died in the war of independence.

The groundbreaking was led by Sukarno, the first Indonesian President, accompanied by Surabaya Mayor, Doel Arnowo on 10 November 1951. It was officially opened one year later, also by Sukarno, on 10 November 1952 witnessed by Surabaya Mayor, R. Moestadjab Soemowidigdo.

The 10 November Museum was built to explain the meaning behind the Heroes Monument. The building consists of 2 floors, with exhibitions symbolizing the spirit of the Surabayan people's struggle. There is an auditorium on the first floor. The museum contains reproductions of documentary photographs, and there are dioramas that presents eight events that happened around the 10 November 1945 clashes.

Gallery

References

External links
The Heroes Monument

Buildings and structures in Surabaya
Monuments and memorials in Indonesia
Tourist attractions in East Java
Monumental columns in Indonesia